The 1948 BAA draft was the second annual draft of the Basketball Association of America (BAA), which later became the National Basketball Association (NBA). The draft was held on May 10, 1948, before the 1948–49 season. In this draft, eight BAA teams along with four teams who moved from the National Basketball League, took turns selecting amateur U.S. college basketball players.

Draft selections and draftee career notes
Andy Tonkovich from Marshall University was selected first overall by the Providence Steamrollers. Four of the first round picks, George Kok, George Hauptfuhrer, Bob Gale and Chuck Hanger, never played in the BAA. Four players from this draft, Harry Gallatin, Dolph Schayes, Bobby Wanzer and Alex Hannum have been inducted into the Basketball Hall of Fame.

Draft

Other picks
The following list includes other draft picks who have appeared in at least one BAA/NBA game.

Notable undrafted players
These players were not selected in the 1948 draft but played at least one game in the NBA.

Notes

See also
 List of first overall NBA draft picks

References
General

Specific

External links
NBA.com
NBA.com: NBA Draft History

Draft
Basketball Association of America draft
BAA draft
BAA draft
1940s in Chicago
Basketball in Chicago
Events in Chicago